Terrell County Airport  is a county-owned, public-use airport in Terrell County, Texas, United States. The airport is located five nautical miles (6 mi, 9 km) west of the central business district of Dryden, Texas, and about 14 miles southeast of Sanderson, Texas.  It provides general aviation service.

History 
Established as Kaufman Municipal Airport.  Taken over by United States Army Air Forces on November 12, 1942.  Assigned to the USAAF Gulf Coast Training Center (later Central Flying Training Command) as a primary (level 1) pilot training airfield.

Flying training was performed with Fairchild PT-19s as the primary trainer. Also had several PT-17 Stearmans and a few P-40 Warhawks assigned. Inactivated September 30, 1945 with the drawdown of AAFTC's pilot training program and was declared surplus and turned over to the Army Corps of Engineers. Eventually discharged to the War Assets Administration (WAA) returned to civil control.

Facilities and aircraft 
Terrell County Airport covers an area of 644 acres (261 ha) at an elevation of 2,322 feet (708 m) above mean sea level. It has two runways, 4/22 and 13/31, each of which has an asphalt surface measuring 4,525 by 75 feet (1,379 x 23 m). For the 12-month period ending August 10, 2009, the airport had 300 general aviation aircraft operations, an average of 25 per month.

See also 

 Texas World War II Army Airfields
 List of airports in Texas

References 

 
 Manning, Thomas A. (2005), History of Air Education and Training Command, 1942–2002.  Office of History and Research, Headquarters, AETC, Randolph AFB, Texas 
 Shaw, Frederick J. (2004), Locating Air Force Base Sites, History’s Legacy, Air Force History and Museums Program, United States Air Force, Washington DC.

External links 
 Aerial image as of January 1996 from USGS The National Map
 

Airports in Texas
Buildings and structures in Terrell County, Texas
Transportation in Terrell County, Texas
Airfields of the United States Army Air Forces in Texas
USAAF Contract Flying School Airfields
Airports established in 1943
1943 establishments in Texas